Nauheed Cyrusi is a British actress, model, and VJ.

Early life 

Cyrusi was born into an Indian Parsi Zoroastrian family in Belfast, Northern Ireland. She graduated from Jai Hind College.

Career 

Nauheed first appeared in an advertisement for Dhara Refined Oil, while she was in school. Subsequently, she went on to appear in advertisements for Head & Shoulders, Britannia Little Hearts Biscuits, and Ayurvedic Concepts (now Himalaya).

She also appeared in several music videos, most notably for the song "Piya Basanti".

She made her debut in 2003 with Padam Kumar's Hindi film, Supari, starring Uday Chopra. Subsequently, Vikram Bhatt chose her for Inteha opposite Ashmit Patel. She then appeared in youth-oriented tele-series Hip Hip Hurray. In 2004, Cyrusi starred in the Telugu film Sakhiya with Tarun Kumar. 

She attended the India Fashion Week and the Allen Solly Fashion Show, along with fellow actress Koel Purie. In 2007, she appeared in Life Mein Kabhie Kabhiee, ADA...A Way of Life, and Anwar, which was directed by Manish Jha, and also Lakeer.

She had roles in Kisaan and Kurbaan in 2009 and Kuch Spice To Make It Meetha in 2012 with Purab Kohli and Kavish Mishra (Composer).

Personal life 
She married Rustom Contractor on 5 January 2017.

Album

Filmography

Films

Television

Web series

References

External links 

 

Year of birth missing (living people)
Living people
Actresses from Belfast
Parsi people
British film actresses
British television actresses
British web series actresses
British people of Parsi descent
British actresses of Indian descent
British Zoroastrians
Actresses from Mumbai
Actresses in Hindi cinema
Actresses in Telugu cinema
Actresses in Hindi television
British expatriate actresses in India
European actresses in India
British VJs (media personalities)
Fear Factor: Khatron Ke Khiladi participants
21st-century British actresses